Lenie Dijkstra (born 3 October 1967 in Joure, Friesland) is a female road and mountain bike racing cyclist from the Netherlands. Her first victory was the Dutch Food Valley Classic in 1990. She became Dutch National Time Trial Champion in 1992.

References

1967 births
Living people
Dutch female cyclists
Dutch cycling time trial champions
People from Skarsterlân
Cyclists from Friesland